Paid is a 1930 American pre-Code drama film starring Joan Crawford, Robert Armstrong, and Kent Douglass in a story about a wrongly accused ex-convict who seeks revenge on those who sent her to prison using a scam called the "Heart Balm Racket".

The film was adapted by Lucien Hubbard and Charles MacArthur from the play, Within the Law by Bayard Veiller (1912) and was the fourth film version of the play. The film was directed and produced by Sam Wood.

Cast
 Joan Crawford as Mary Turner
 Robert Armstrong as Joe Garson
 Marie Prevost as Agnes Lynch
 Kent Douglass as Bob Gilder
 John Miljan as Inspector Burke
 Purnell Pratt as Edward Gilder
 Hale Hamilton as District Attorney Demarest
 Robert Emmett O'Connor as Detective Sergeant Cassidy
 Tyrell Davis as Eddie Griggs
 William Bakewell as B.M. Carney
 George Cooper as Red
 Gwen Lee as Bertha
 Louise Beavers as Black Convict (uncredited)
 Edward Brophy as Burglar (uncredited)
 Payne B. Johnson as Baby (uncredited)
 Fred Kelsey as Night Policeman (uncredited)
 Wilbur Mack as Mr. Irwin (uncredited)
 Tom Mahoney as Policeman at District Attorney's Office (uncredited)
 Polly Moran as Polly
 Lee Phelps as Court Bailiff (uncredited)
 Herbert Prior as General Harrison (uncredited)
 Jed Prouty as Policeman Williams (uncredited)
 Walter Walker as Judge Lawler (uncredited)
 Clarence Wilson as Max Hardy (uncredited)

Reception

Photoplay commented, "The story is absorbing and Joan is simply grand!" The New York Times noted, "Miss Crawford and Miss Prevost are very good in their roles."

Box office
According to MGM records the film earned $920,000 in the US and Canada and $311,000 elsewhere resulting in a profit of $415,000.

Adaptations
Paid was remade in Bollywood as the film Intaqam starring Sadhana.

References

External links

1930 films
1930 drama films
American drama films
1930s English-language films
American black-and-white films
Metro-Goldwyn-Mayer films
American films based on plays
Films directed by Sam Wood
Films with screenplays by Charles MacArthur
1930s American films